Kartal Özmızrak (born 29 August 1995) is a Turkish professional basketball player for Bahçeşehir Koleji of the Basketbol Süper Ligi (BSL) and Basketball Champions League.

Professional career
Kartal was a product of Beşiktaş youth system and he also played there between 2011 and 2015. During this period, he has been loaned to Eskişehir Basket for 2014–15 season.

On 8 December 2015 he signed with Darüşşafaka and then loaned to İstanbul BB for two seasons.

On 6 July 2020 he signed with Obradoiro of the Liga ACB.

On 6 July 2021 he signed with Bahçeşehir Koleji of the Turkish Basketbol Süper Ligi (BSL).

References

External links
 Profile at tblstat.net
 Profile at fiba.com

1995 births
Living people
Bahçeşehir Koleji S.K. players
Beşiktaş men's basketball players
Darüşşafaka Basketbol players
Eskişehir Basket players
İstanbul Büyükşehir Belediyespor basketball players
Obradoiro CAB players
People from Bakırköy
Point guards
Basketball players from Istanbul
Turkish men's basketball players
21st-century Turkish people